NGC 7087 is a barred spiral galaxy located about 215 million light-years away in the constellation of Grus. NGC 7087 was discovered by astronomer John Herschel on September 4, 1834.  

NGC 7087 is a member of a group of galaxies known as the NGC 7087 group.

See also 
 NGC 1300

References

External links 

Barred spiral galaxies
Grus (constellation)
7087
66988
Astronomical objects discovered in 1834